Aisha Somtochukwu Yesufu  (born 12 December 1973) is a Nigerian activist and businesswoman. She co-founded the #BringBackOurGirls movement, which brings attention to the abduction of over 200 girls from a secondary school in Chibok, Nigeria on 14 April 2014, by the terrorist group Boko Haram. She has also been prominently involved in the End SARS movement against police brutality in Nigeria.

Early life and education 
Aisha Somtochukwu Yesufu was born and raised in Kano State, and is from Agbede in Edo State. She experienced the difficulties of being a girl in a heavily patriarchal environment. She has said that by the time she was 11 years old, she didn't have any female friends because they had all been married or died in childbirth, and that by the time she married at 24, most of her friends were nearly grandmothers. She says her love of books helped her during childhood, and reading made her realise "there was a world beyond the ghetto that I was growing up in… and I wanted that life". She applied to the Nigerian Defence Academy in 1991, but was rejected because she was a woman. She was initially admitted to Usmanu Danfodiyo University in 1992, but after the school closed she enrolled at Ahmadu Bello University to study medicine. Yesufu left Ahmadu Bello University after the school was also closed, following the killing of a professor in 1994. She completed her education at Bayero University Kano, from which she graduated with a degree in microbiology.

Activism 
Njideka Agbo wrote of Yesufu in The Guardian in 2019, "Often maligned for her stance on national issues in Nigeria by pro-government voices, she is not a run-of-the-mill activist. Her penchant for naming names has earned her truckloads of enemies, and perhaps, admirers".

#BringBackOurGirls 

After the terrorist group Boko Haram abducted 276 schoolgirls in 2014, Yesufu and Oby Ezekwesili co-founded the #BringBackOurGirls movement to push for their rescue. Yesufu was among the women protestors who marched on the Nigerian National Assembly, in the nation's capital, Abuja, on 30 April 2014.

End SARS 

Yesufu has been a prominent member of the End SARS movement, which began in 2017 and draws attention to police brutality in Nigeria and draws its name from a controversial police unit in the Nigeria Police Force called the Special Anti-Robbery Squad (SARS). A photograph of her wearing hijab at an End SARS protest became an iconic symbol of the movement. Yesufu has said of the End SARS protests, "I will not be an irresponsible parent and leave this fight for my children. I am ready to sacrifice my life for my children to live. I brought them to this world, and I need to fix the world I put them in."

Awards
Yesufu was among BBC's 100 Women in 2020. Yesufu was included in a list of the Top 100 Most Influential Africans by New African magazine in 2020.

Personal life
Yesufu married her husband, Aliu, in 1998. They have two children.

References

External links 

 
 

1973 births
Ahmadu Bello University alumni
Bayero University Kano alumni
BBC 100 Women
End SARS activists
Living people
Nigerian businesspeople
Nigerian human rights activists
Nigerian microbiologists
Nigerian Muslim activists
Nigerian women activists
People from Edo State
People from Kano
Usmanu Danfodiyo University alumni